The Truth and the Light: Music from the X-Files is a 1996 album by Mark Snow. The album is composed of excerpts of instrumental music scores from the first three seasons of the American science fiction television series The X-Files, on which Snow was the resident composer. These tracks are linked together with portions of dialogue from the series.

Released on October 8, 1996, the album received mixed reviews from critics. It reached a peak position of number forty-two in the UK albums chart, and spent four weeks in France's album charts, peaking at number nine.

Track listing

Personnel

Release

The Truth and the Light: Music from The X-Files was released by Warner Bros. Records on October 8, 1996, on both compact disc and compact cassette formats. It spent two weeks in the UK Albums Chart, reaching a peak position of number forty-two on September 12, 1996. The album spent four weeks in France's Syndicat National de l'Édition Phonographique album chart between September 14 and October 26, 1996. It entered the chart at number forty-two, before peaking at number nine, and finally dropping to number forty-three before leaving the chart entirely. A more comprehensive four-disc collection of Snow's compositions for The X-Files was released by record company La-La Land Records in May 2011, containing several of the cues found on The Truth and the Light.

Reception

The Truth and the Light has received mixed reviews from critics. AllMusic's Stephen Thomas Erlewine rated the album four stars out of five, calling it "evocative and eerie", noting that "it holds up surprisingly well when isolated from the visuals" of the series. Filmtracks.com's Christian Clemmensen rated it two stars out of five, calling it a "basically adequate souvenir of sorts". Clemmensen lamented that the inclusion of dialogue from the series hindered the album as a whole, explaining that "inconsistent incorporation of dialogue hinders the album's continuity". He also felt that the cues included on the album did not reflect Snow's best work on the series, which in his view would come from the later seasons, but that the album instead reflected "Snow's darker, ambient, and atonal music", though admitting that there was still an audience for "those creepy sounds".

Footnotes

The X-Files music
Mark Snow albums
1996 soundtrack albums
Television soundtracks
Warner Records soundtracks